Events in the year 1998 in Israel.

Incumbents
 President of Israel – Ezer Weizman
 Prime Minister of Israel – Benjamin Netanyahu (Likud)
 President of the Supreme Court – Aharon Barak
 Chief of General Staff – Amnon Lipkin-Shahak until 9 July, Shaul Mofaz
 Government of Israel – 27th Government of Israel

Events

 22 January – The launch of the Israeli reconnaissance satellite Ofek-4 fails.
 1 April – The Azrieli Center complex of skyscrapers officially opens, becoming the tallest building in Israel (Azrieli Center Circular Tower stands at 187 m).
 9 May – Dana International wins first place for Israel at the Eurovision Song Contest with the song “Diva”.
 9 July – Shaul Mofaz, is appointed as the 16th Chief of Staff of the Israel Defense Forces.
 26 November – Miss Israel, Linor Abargil, wins the title of Miss World 1998.

Israeli–Palestinian conflict 

The most prominent events related to the Israeli–Palestinian conflict which occurred during 1998 include:

 23 October – Benjamin Netanyahu and Yasser Arafat sign the Wye River Memorandum which details the steps to be taken by the Israeli government and the Palestinian Authority to implement the earlier Interim Agreement of 1995.

Notable Palestinian militant operations against Israeli targets

The most prominent Palestinian militant acts and operations committed against Israeli targets during 1998 include:

 29 October – Kfar Darom bombing
 6 November – Jerusalem bombing

Notable Israeli military operations against Palestinian militancy targets

The most prominent Israeli military counter-terrorism operations (military campaigns and military operations) carried out against Palestinian militants during 1998 include:

Unknown dates 
 The founding of the community settlement Ahuzat Barak.

Notable births
 13 June – Abdallah El Akal, actor
 2 November – Nadav Guedj, singer

Notable deaths

 20 January – Zevulun Hammer (b. 1936), Israeli politician.
 10 March – Rabbi Hayim David HaLevi (b. 1924), Chief Rabbi of Tel Aviv.
 14 May – Yitzhak Modai (b. 1926), Israeli politician.
 16 May – Idov Cohen (b. 1909), Romanian-born Israeli politician.
 20 May – Jacob Katz (b. 1904), Hungarian-born Israeli historian.
 13 June – Nisim Aloni (b. 1926), Israeli playwright.
 13 July – Ben Zion Abba Shaul (b. 1924), Israeli Sephardic rabbi.
 29 September – Nechama Hendel (b. 1936), Israeli singer, actress, guitarist and entertainer.

Major public holidays

See also
 1998 in Israeli film
 1998 in Israeli television
 1998 in Israeli music
 1998 in Israeli sport
 Israel in the Eurovision Song Contest 1998
 Israel at the 1998 Winter Olympics

References

External links

 IDF History in 1998 @ dover.idf.il